Bešenovački Prnjavor is a village in Serbia. It is situated in the Sremska Mitrovica municipality, in the Syrmia District, Vojvodina province. The village has a Serb ethnic majority and it is the smallest village in the municipality - its population numbering 145 people (2002 census). Near the village is Bešenovo monastery, one of 16 Serb Orthodox monasteries on Fruška Gora mountain.

Name
In Serbian, the village is known as Bešenovački Prnjavor (Бешеновачки Прњавор), in Croatian as Bešenovački Prnjavor, and in Hungarian as Besenyőmonostor.

Historical population

1981: 150
1991: 140
2002: 145

See also
Bešenovo monastery
List of places in Serbia
List of cities, towns and villages in Vojvodina

References
Slobodan Ćurčić, Broj stanovnika Vojvodine, Novi Sad, 1996.

External links 
 Besenovo monastery
 Манастир Бешеново (Besenovo monastery) (Facebook Account)

Populated places in Syrmia
Sremska Mitrovica